Hallsborough Tavern is a historic inn and tavern located near Midlothian, Chesterfield County, Virginia.  The original center section was built about 1790, and is a 1 1/2-story, three bay, double pen frame structure on a brick foundation.  It was expanded by 1832, with the addition of the 1 1/2-story western section and two-story, double pen eastern section. It served travelers on the old Buckingham Road throughout much of the 19th century.

It was listed on the National Register of Historic Places in 1980.

References

Hotel buildings on the National Register of Historic Places in Virginia
Buildings and structures in Chesterfield County, Virginia
Hotel buildings completed in 1790
National Register of Historic Places in Chesterfield County, Virginia
1790 establishments in Virginia